Craig John Knowles  (born 27 February 1959) is a former Australian politician and member of the New South Wales Legislative Assembly from 1990 to 2005.

Early life
Knowles' parents were Marie and Stan Knowles, member for Ingleburn from 1981 to 1988 and Macquarie Fields from 1988 to 1990.  He was born in Liverpool, New South Wales and educated at Liverpool Boys High School, Sydney College of Technical and Further Education. He worked in the New South Wales Department of Business and Consumer Affairs from 1988 and was the Western Sydney Co-ordinator in the Office of State Development of New South Wales Premiers' Department from 1987 to 1988.  He was an alderman on Liverpool City Council from 1982 to 1994 and Mayor from 1986 until 1988.

Political career
Knowles served as a Labor Party member for Macquarie Fields from May 1990 to May 1991, Moorebank from 1991 to 1999 and Macquarie Fields from 1999 to 2005.  He was Minister for Urban Affairs and Planning from 1995 to 1999, Minister for Health from 1999 to 2003 and Minister for Infrastructure and Planning and Minister for Natural Resources from 2003 to 2005.

Knowles introduced a number of changes during his time as Planning Minister. These included the introduction of private certification of buildings. Another controversial change was the introduction of Part 3A of the Environmental Planning and Assessment Act, which increased the powers of the Minister in approving major developments and superseded heritage and environmental protection legislation.

Knowles' political career was damaged by allegations raised by nurse Nola Fraser in relation to deaths at Campbelltown and Camden hospitals when he was Minister for Health.  An Independent Commission Against Corruption inquiry into Knowles' behaviour cleared the minister in September 2005, but he had already been moved from the health portfolio.  He was also damaged by the Orange Grove affair, as a supporter of a retail outlet, which was later found to have been opened in contravention of zoning regulations in his electorate, while he was Minister for Urban Affairs and Planning.  In April 2005, he was charged with drink-driving at a random breath test, with a low-level over the limit reading.

Knowles had been considered a possible successor to Bob Carr as Premier but declined to be nominated when Carr retired in August 2005; himself resigning from the ministry the same day as Carr and his deputy, Andrew Refshauge.  Knowles resigned from parliament a few days later, sparking the 2005 Macquarie Fields by-election. He was ultimately succeeded by Labor's candidate Steven Chaytor.

After politics
After his retirement from politics, Knowles became a consultant and political lobbyist. He has a number of advisory roles, statutory appointments, and non-profit directorships, including:
President, the Asthma Foundation of New South Wales (since 2008–present)
Director, the Black Dog Institute
Director, the Children's Medical Research Institute (2007–present)
Director, the Học Mãi Foundation at The University of Sydney
Member, Advisory Board, Built Holdings Pty Limited
Chair, Murray Darling Basin Authority (2011–2015)

At the 2015 Australia Day Honours, Knowles was appointed a Member of the Order of Australia for significant service to local government, to the Parliament of New South Wales, and to the community through a range of health initiatives.

In January 2018, Knowles was appointed by Trade Minister Steven Ciobo as the Consul-General of Australia in Auckland, New Zealand.

References

 

|-

|-

|-

|-

1959 births
Living people
Members of the New South Wales Legislative Assembly
Members of the Order of Australia
Politicians from Sydney
Australian Labor Party members of the Parliament of New South Wales
21st-century Australian politicians
Australian consuls
Mayors of places in New South Wales